Zabrus oertzeni is a species of ground beetle in the Pelor subgenus that is endemic to Crete.

Subspecies
There are four subspecies of Z. oertzeni:
Z. oertzeni creticus Reitter, 1889
Z. oertzeni leukaorensis Maran, 1947
Z. oertzeni oertzeni Reitter, 1885
Z. oertzeni stepaneki Maran, 1947

References

Beetles described in 1885
Beetles of Europe
Endemic arthropods of Crete
Zabrus